The 1946–47 Segunda División season was the 16th since its establishment and was played between 22 September 1946 and 13 April 1947.

Overview before the season
14 teams joined the league, including two relegated from the 1945–46 La Liga and three promoted from the 1945–46 Tercera División.

Relegated from La Liga
Alcoyano
Hércules

Promoted from Tercera División'''
Málaga
Levante
Baracaldo

Teams

League table

Results

Top goalscorers

Top goalkeepers

Promotion playoffs

Relegation playoffs

External links
BDFútbol

Segunda División seasons
2
Spain